Jill Marsden may refer to:

Jill Marsden (scholar) (born 1964), British scholar
Jill Marsden (EastEnders), fictional character